An axial five-stone circle is a particular type of megalithic ring of five stones of which many are found in southwest Ireland. These circles have an approximate axis of symmetry aligned in a generally northeast–southwest direction – the stone at the southwest side of the circle, rather than being an upright orthostat like the rest, rests on the ground with its long axis horizontal. Because it marks the axis it is called the axial stone. It is usually quite thin and it lies with its long thin edge along the circumference of the ring.

There are two types of axial stone circle, one type with five stones, listed here, and axial multiple-stone circles, with seven stones or more, listed at List of axial multiple-stone circles. Dating from the Bronze Age, these circles when constructed had an odd number of stones with two stones (portal stones) placed on either side of where the axis crosses the northeast side of the ring. They are found in County Cork and County Kerry.

Early in the 20th century this type of circle was called a recumbent stone circle by analogy with similar examples in Scotland but when it became clear there were substantial differences the term "Cork–Kerry stone circle" was used for both types until later the term "axial stone circle" became commonly used.

Ireland's National Monuments Service, part of the Department of Culture, Heritage and the Gaeltacht, operates a database of archaeology sites and the list in this article covers the sites classified as "stone circle – five-stone". The NMS definition is: 

Included are 56 sites in County Cork and three in County Kerry.

List of axial five-stone circles

The map shows the locations of the 56 sites in counties Cork and Kerry. All the locations can be displayed dynamically via the OpenStreetMap viewer.

See also
List of recumbent stone circles

Notes

References

Citations

Works cited

Further reading
  – excavation of Kealkill
  – excavation of Cashelkeelty

Axial five-stone circles
Axial five-stone circles
Axial five-stone circles
Bronze Age Ireland
Lists of archaeological sites in Ireland